Uwe Freiler (born 2 May 1966 in Limbach (Saarland)) is a retired German football player. He spent four seasons in the Bundesliga with FC 08 Homburg and SV Waldhof Mannheim.

References

External links 
 

1966 births
Living people
People from Saarlouis (district)
German footballers
Association football forwards
Bundesliga players
2. Bundesliga players
FC 08 Homburg players
SV Waldhof Mannheim players
Footballers from Saarland
FK Pirmasens players